Nico Müller (born 25 February 1992 in Thun) is a Swiss professional racing driver. He is currently competing in the FIA World Endurance Championship for Peugeot Sport and in Formula E for ABT Cupra.

Career

Karting
Müller began his karting career in 2004 and the following year, Müller finished sixth in the Bridgestone Cup Switzerland ICA Junior class. He improved to third place in the same competition in 2006 and also finished as runner-up in the Swiss Junior Championship. In 2007, he won the Bridgestone Cup Switzerland KF3 class, winning the title by a single point, and took fifth place in the Swiss KF3 championship.

Formula Renault 2.0
In 2008, Müller stepped up to single-seaters, racing in his native Formula Renault series for Jenzer Motorsport. In his first year in the category, he finished fifth, taking a victory at Spa-Francorchamps along with two other podium places. He also took part in selected races of both the Italian Formula Renault 2.0 and Formula Renault 2.0 West European Cup series. In November of that year, he contested the Italian Formula Renault 2.0 Winter Series, which was held over two races at the Imola circuit. Müller took two podium places to finish third in the standings, behind Kazim Vasiliauskas and champion Daniel Mancinelli.

Müller remained in the Swiss Formula Renault 2.0 series in 2009 and wrapped up the title in dominant fashion, finishing on the podium in all twelve races, taking nine victories and nine pole positions.

He also contested a full season of the Eurocup Formula Renault 2.0 championship with Jenzer Motorsport. He originally finished third in his début race in Barcelona, but was later promoted to second following the disqualification of race winner Albert Costa. During the season he took a further four points-scoring positions to finish eleventh in the championship, the third highest placed rookie driver.

GP3 Series
In 2010, Müller graduated to the new GP3 Series, continuing his long relationship with Jenzer Motorsport. He took his first victory in the category at the third round of the season in Valencia, winning the sprint race after starting from the front row of the grid. Another podium followed at the next round at Silverstone before he took his second win of the year with victory from pole position in the feature race at the Hungaroring.

A haul of nine points in the final round at Monza ensured that Müller finished the season third overall behind Robert Wickens and eventual champion Esteban Gutiérrez. Müller will remain in the championship with Jenzer Motorsport for a second season in 2011.

World Rallycross
Müller competed in the 2017 World RX of France  and the 2017 World RX of Latvia for the EKS RX team. He finished the events 17th and 6th respectively.

Sports car racing

In October 2017, it was announced that Müller would replace relief driver James Rossiter in the No. 26 G-Drive Racing Oreca 07, partnering regular drivers Roman Rusinov and Pierre Thiriet for the 6 Hours of Shanghai in November. He finished seventh after colliding with three cars during the course of the race. That month, Müller was entered into the 2017 FIA GT World Cup, driving an Audi R8 LMS with Audi Sport Team WRT, and was caught up in a first lap multi-car accident in the qualifying race. His car was repaired in time for the main race, but crashed out after hitting a car that spun ahead of him.

Other series
At the end of October 2009, Müller tested a Formula Renault 3.5 Series car for the first time, driving for Prema Powerteam at Motorland Aragón in Spain as a prize for winning the Swiss Formula Renault title. A week later, he took part in the first International Formula Master test session of the winter at the Hungaroring, finishing as the fastest driver on day one before taking second place the following day.

Formula E
Having acted as a development driver for the Audi Sport ABT Schaeffler team for two seasons, Müller made his Formula E debut in the 2019–20 season, driving for GEOX Dragon alongside Brendon Hartley. His package proved to be largely uncompetitive, leading to the Swiss driver ending up 25th in the standings, lowest of all full-time competitors.

In 2021, Müller remained with the rebranded Dragon / Penske Autosport for another campaign in Formula E. He scored a number of points finishes, including a surprise podium during the Valencia ePrix, a race in which a myriad of drivers ran out of useable energy with mere minutes remaining. Müller eventually exited the series, being replaced by Joel Eriksson for the second half of the season.

Müller returned to Formula E in 2023, joining the newly re-entered ABT CUPRA outfit for the start of the Gen3 era. The season began in disappointing fashion, with the team playing catch-up to its rivals due to their one-year hiatus from the series, which was compounded by the Swiss driver crashing during Race 2 in Diriyah. A first glimmer of hope materialised in Hyderabad, where a chaotic race with a plethora of retirements elevated Müller to eleventh at the finish, with him having set the fastest lap of the race.

Racing record

Career summary

† As Müller was a guest driver, he was ineligible for points.
* Season still in progress.

Complete Eurocup Formula Renault 2.0 results
(key) (Races in bold indicate pole position) (Races in italics indicate fastest lap)

Complete GP3 Series results
(key) (Races in bold indicate pole position) (Races in italics indicate fastest lap)

Complete Formula Renault 3.5 Series results
(key) (Races in bold indicate pole position) (Races in italics indicate fastest lap)

Complete Deutsche Tourenwagen Masters results
(key) (Races in bold indicate pole position) (Races in italics indicate fastest lap)

Complete Blancpain GT Series Sprint Cup results

Complete FIA World Rallycross Championship results
(key)

Supercar

Complete FIA World Endurance Championship results

* Season still in progress.

Complete 24 Hours of Le Mans results

Complete Formula E results
(key) (Races in bold indicate pole position; races in italics indicate fastest lap)

Complete IMSA SportsCar Championship results
(key) (Races in bold indicate pole position; results in italics indicate fastest lap)

† Points only counted towards the Michelin Endurance Cup, and not the overall LMP2 Championship.
* Season still in progress.

References

External links

 
 
 

1992 births
Living people
People from Thun
Swiss racing drivers
Formula Renault Eurocup drivers
Formula Renault 2.0 WEC drivers
Italian Formula Renault 2.0 drivers
Formula Renault 2.0 Alps drivers
Swiss GP3 Series drivers
World Series Formula V8 3.5 drivers
Deutsche Tourenwagen Masters drivers
Blancpain Endurance Series drivers
24 Hours of Spa drivers
Formula E drivers
Jenzer Motorsport drivers
Draco Racing drivers
Audi Sport drivers
Team Rosberg drivers
W Racing Team drivers
Abt Sportsline drivers
Dragon Racing drivers
Sportspeople from the canton of Bern
24 Hours of Le Mans drivers
FIA World Endurance Championship drivers
WeatherTech SportsCar Championship drivers
World Rallycross Championship drivers
Stock Car Brasil drivers
G-Drive Racing drivers
Phoenix Racing drivers
Peugeot Sport drivers
TDS Racing drivers
Nürburgring 24 Hours drivers
Cupra Racing drivers